The Spits are an American punk rock band formed in Kalamazoo, Michigan in 1993. They later moved to Seattle. Currently, the band has released six albums. All are officially self-titled, unofficially titled 1, 2,  3, 4, V, and VI respectively. The albums were released by Nickel and Dime Records, Slovenly Recordings, Dirtnap Records, Thriftstore Records and In the Red Records respectively for the first five. In October 2020, they released their latest album, VI, .

The band describes itself as "Punk for the People", and focuses on loud, noisy, and dirty punk rock.  On stage, band members frequently appear in costumes (e.g. graduation robes, nun outfits, Ronald Reagan masks, or toilet paper "mummy" costumes), and focus on the dirty, low-budget sound and presentation of garage punk.

The Spits' "Bring Down" was featured in Al Partanen's skateboarding segment of the "Born Dead" skate video, as well as Darrel Mathe's section in the snowboarding video "love/HATE". "I H8 Pussies" was featured in Andy Forgash's segment in the snowboarding video, "Burning Bridges" as well. Their song, "Remote Control" appears in the Absinthe Films snowboarding video, "More". "Rip Up The Streets" was featured in Vans skate team commercial 2012 year.

Personnel
 Sean Wood — guitar, vocals
 Erin Wood — bass
 Wayne Draves - drums
 Broose Young – background vocals
 Poya Esghai – keyboard
 Lance Phelps - drums (former)
 Greg T — keyboards (former)
 Darren Benson - keyboards (former)
 Ernie Quintero - keyboards (former)
 Joe Pestilence - keyboards (former)
 Nick Markel - keyboards (former)
 Johnny LZR - keyboards (former)

Discography

Singles 
19 Million A.C. 7" (Dirtnap Records, 2001, ZZZ 10)
 A1. 19 Million A.C. 
 A2. Tease 
 B1. Shitty World 
 B1. Dumb
Later released on CD w/Bonus Songs "19 Million A.C. EP CD" 
CD Later released w/Bonus Songs on LP "19 Million A.C. EP CD LP" 

Spend the Night in a Haunted House with...The Spits 7" (Missile X Records, 2004, MX 003)
 A1. Halloween Fun
 A2. Black Candles
 B1. Spend the Night in a Haunted House with The Spits
Clear green vinyl, 500 copies, released with a candy sucker for the little Trick-r-Treaters

Pain 7" (Slovenly Recordings, 2009, 702-89)
 A1. Pain (Mollin / Silvestri)
 A2. Beat You Up
 B1. Army Life
 B2. Planet Failure

Splits 
Split 7" (Dirtnap Records, 2000, ZZZ 05)
 A1. The Spits: Pissed Off Baby
 A2. The Spits: Fire!
 B1. The Briefs: (I Think) My Baby Is A Communist
 B2. The Briefs: Silver Bullet
black-white-red sleeve, purple-marbled vinyl, 1000 pressed black-white-blue sleeve

Split 7" (Puke Records, 2005, No. 009)
 A1. The Spits: Spazmotic Caress
 A2. The Spits: Terrorist Attack
 B1. The Triggers: No Bullshit
 B2. The Triggers: Kill Your Ego
red or black vinyl         

Split 7" (Scion Audio/Visual, 2010, #SAVG0109)
 A1. The Spits: Come With Me (Yeah, Wontcha)
 B1. Dan Melchior: Horrorshow

NOFX/The Spits Split 7" (Fat Wreckchords, 2010, FAT-245)
 A1. Nofx: Hold it Back
 A2. Nofx: Teenage Existentialist
 B1. The Spits: Wait
 B2. The Spits: Get Our Kicks

Albums 
Spits - "Demo" Self Released
 Tired and Lonely
 Black Kar
 SK8
 Saturday Nite

The Spits CD (Nickel & Dime Records, 2000, N&D 001)
 Dropout
 SK8
 Die Die Die
 Black Kar
 Saturday Nite
 Remote Kontrol
 Tired & Lonely
 I H8 Pussies
 Suzy's Face

The Spits 12"EP/CD (Slovenly Recordings, 2003, 702-36)
 Spit Me Out
 Black & Blue
 PCT
 Let Us Play Your Party
 Rat Face
 No Place to Live
 Bring
 Take Back the Alley
 She Don't Kare

The Spits LP/CD (Dirtnap Records, 2003, ZZZ 42)
 Witch Hunt
 Space Guitar
 Cha Cha Love
 Tuff News
 Violence Cup
 Nuclear Bomb
 1989
 Don't Shoot
 Greyhound Bound
 Fussin' & Fightin' (vinyl only track)
first 100 on red vinyl

2006 European Tour LP (P.Trash Records, 2006, LIVE TRASH 001)
 Die Die Die
 Dropout
 Saturday Nite
 Take Pleasure in Someone Else's Pain
 What the Fuck
 No Monarchy
 Nuclear Bomb
 Cha Cha Love
 Bring
 Spit Me Out
 Witch Hunt
 Remote Control

Returning to Their Hometown LP (Thriftstore Records, 2006, ZZZ 42)
 Caza De La Bruja
 Guitarra Del Espacio
 Amor De Cha Cha
 Noticias De Tuff
 Taza De La Violencia
 Bomba Nuclear
 Mil Novecientos Ochenta Y Nueve
 No Tire
 Limite Del Galgo
 Fusin' Y Un Fightin'

The Spits Live Volume 1 (Self Released Vinyl; 8-track tape released by Regal Select)        
 Die Die Die
 Dropout
 Saturday Nite
 Take Pleasure in Someone Else's Pain
 What The Fuck
 No Monarchy
 Nuclear Bomb
 Cha Cha Love
 Bring
 Spit Me Out
 Witch Hunt
 Remote Control
previously released as The Spits 2006 Tour LP

19 Million A.C. EP CD LP
 19 Million A.C.
 Shitty World
 Dumb
 Tease
 Cha Cha Love
 Remote Control
 Black Car
 Drop Out
 Drink, Fight & Fuck (GG Allin)
 Violence Cup
 Kill from the Heart (Dicks)
 Wendy O
 Violence Cup
 Pissed Off Baby
 Beat My Head
 Let Us Play Your Party
 Fire
 Space Guitar
 Talking 'Bout You
 Die

The Spits IV (School's Out) LP/CD (Thriftstore Records, 2009, 010)
 Tonight
 Rip up the Streets
 Live in a Van
 Eyesore City
 Police
 School's Out
 Life of Crime
 Alienize
 Wouldn't Wanna be Ya
 Flags
 Beat You Up 
 Chemtrails
 Liars
 Army Bound (Later released as "Army Life" on the "Pain" 7")
 Piss on Your Skull
 I Dig Pain (Later released as "Pain" on the "Pain" 7")
 Beat You Up w/Ethan LFD
Tracks 11-17 are cassette only

The Spits V (2012)
 All I Want
 My Mess
 Tomorrow's Children
 Electric Brain
 Fed Up
 Fallout Beach
 My Life Sucks
 I'm Scum
 Brick By Brick
 Acid Rain
 I Wanna Be A.D.D. 
 Last Man On Earth

The Spits VI (2020)
 Up All Night
 Out of Time
 Cop Kar
 Breakdown
 Creep
 Broken Glass
 Lose My Mind
 It's Over
 They
 Wurms

Compilations appeared on
 I Was A Teenage Plasmatic, 7 Songs For Wendy O Williams 7" (Jonny Cat Records, 2001, FY*WOW) 
 Dirtnap Across The Northwest CD (Dirtnap Records, 2003, ZZZ 25) 
 Slovenly Sampler CD (Slovenly Recordings, 2004, 702-47) 
 Funhouse Comp Thing II (My Fat Ass, 2008)

References

External links

Garage rock groups from Michigan
Garage punk groups
Punk rock groups from Michigan
Dirtnap Records artists
In the Red artists